Naoki Rossi (born 20 January 2007) is a Swiss figure skater. He is the 2023 World Junior silver medalist.

Personal life 
Rossi was born in Zollikerberg, Switzerland. Born to a Japanese mother and Italian-Swiss father, he speaks Japanese, German, English, French, and Italian. Formerly an avid violinist, he started playing the violin before becoming interested in skating, but stopped after moving to Italy.

Career

Early years 
When Rossi was five years old, his parents brought him to a nearby ice rink to channel his energy, and he soon decided to continue skating. He competed in the advanced novice category during the 2018–19 and 2019–20 seasons.

In the 2020–21 season, he relocated from Switzerland to Italy, deciding to train at the Young Goose Academy in Egna. His first junior international event was the NRW Trophy in November 2020.

2021–22 season 
Rossi's ISU Junior Grand Prix (JGP) debut came in September 2021; he placed eighth in Košice, Slovakia, and then fourth in Gdańsk, Poland. He subsequently appeared at a number of other minor international events, and won the Swiss national junior title for the first time.

Ranked twelfth in the short progran and seventh in the free skate, Rossi finished ninth overall at the 2022 World Junior Championships in Tallinn, Estonia.

2022–23 season 
Again given two Junior Grand Prix assignments, Rossi finished eighth at the 2022 JGP Poland and fourth at the 2022 JGP Italy. He then made his international senior debut on the Challenger circuit, coming seventh at both the 2022 CS Ice Challenge and the 2022 CS Warsaw Cup.

In the new year, Rossi competed at the European Youth Olympic Winter Festival and won the bronze medal. He then won another bronze medal at the senior level at the Tallink Hotels Cup. Assigned to finish his season at the 2023 World Junior Championships in Calgary, Rossi finished third in the short program with a new personal best score of 79.46, winning a bronze small medal. He was third in the free skate as well, but finished second overall and won the silver medal. This was the first Junior World medal for a Swiss skater since Sarah Meier's bronze medal in 2000, the first for a Swiss man since Richard Furrer also won bronze in 1977, and the highest colour of medal for any Swiss skater even at the event. Rossi said he was "actually speechless. I never expected to be on the podium."

Programs

Competitive highlights 
GP: Grand Prix; CS: Challenger Series; JGP: Junior Grand Prix

References

External links 
 
 

2007 births
Living people
Sportspeople from the canton of Zürich
Swiss male single skaters